Armoire Officielle  is a fashion house based out of Copenhagen, Denmark.

It owns the menswear brand Armoire d'homme and the womenswear brand Armoire de femme.

History
The company was founded as a menswear brand in 2012 by Norwegian-born designer Kjetil Aas under the name Armoire d'homme.

In 2015, the company changed its name to Armoire Officielle when launching its first womenswear collection under the name Armoire de femme in 2015.

The brand opened a flagship store at Lille Kanikkestræde (No. 3) in Copenhagen in 2016.

References

External links
Official Website
Stitched NFL Jerseys
Custom Soccer Jerseys

Clothing brands
Clothing brands of Denmark
Clothing companies of Denmark
Clothing retailers of Denmark
Danish companies established in 2012
Clothing companies based in Copenhagen